Thomas A. Gallo (December 5, 1914 – December 9, 1994) was an American Democratic Party politician who served 11 years in the New Jersey General Assembly from Hoboken.

Biography
Gallo was born on December 5, 1914 in Hoboken. He graduated from Demarest High School (Now Hoboken High School) and the Seth Boyden School of Business (later merged into the University of Newark and now part of Rutgers University–Newark). He served on the Hoboken Board of Adjustment and in 1951 was elected to the Hoboken City Commission and served for two years. After a change in the city's form of government, he returned to the city council in 1965 and was the council president until February 1973, shortly after being seated in the Assembly. While in the Assembly, he was the secretary to the Hoboken Board of Education, a position he held until 1979. He was married to the former Adelaide Witt and had a total of four children.

In September 1972, District 12-C Assemblyman Silvio Failla was murdered in a robbery, leaving one seat vacant. Gallo ran as a Democrat first in the December 18, 1972 special primary election; he was successful against four other Democrats. In the January 8, 1973 special election, he ran against Republican Nilo Juri and defeated him. The next year, Gallo ran in the new 33rd district alongside Christopher Jackman. The two men would be elected to the General Assembly for the next five terms from the same district until Gallo retired prior to the 1983 elections.

A life-long resident of Hoboken, he died at Jersey Shore Medical Center in Neptune Township, New Jersey on December 9, 1994, shortly after turning 80 years old. He was survived by his wife and children.

References

1914 births
1994 deaths
Hoboken High School alumni
New Jersey city council members
Democratic Party members of the New Jersey General Assembly
Politicians from Hoboken, New Jersey
Rutgers University–Newark alumni
20th-century American politicians